East Mountain Teaching denotes the teachings of the Fourth Ancestor Dayi Daoxin, his student and heir the Fifth Ancestor Daman Hongren, and their students and lineage of Chan Buddhism.

East Mountain Teaching gets its name from the East Mountain Temple on the "Twin Peaks" of Huangmei (modern Hubei). The East Mountain Temple was on the easternmost peak of the two. Its modern name is Wuzu Temple.

The two most famous disciples of Hongren, Huineng and Yuquan Shenxiu, both continued the East Mountain teaching.

History
The East Mountain School was established by Daoxin ( 580–651) at East Mountain Temple on Potou (Broken Head) Mountain, which was later renamed Shuangfeng (Twin Peaks). Daoxin taught there for 30 years. He established the first monastic home for "Bodhidharma's Zen".

The tradition holds that Hongren ( 601–674) left home at an early age (between seven and fourteen) and lived at East Mountain Temple on Twin Peaks, where Daoxin was the abbot.

Teachings
The East Mountain community was a specialized meditation training centre. The establishment of a community in one location was a change from the wandering lives of Bodhidharma and Huike and their followers. It fit better into Chinese society, which highly valued community-oriented behaviour over solitary practice.

An important aspect of the East Mountain Teachings was its nonreliance on a single sutra or a single set of sutras for its doctrinal foundation as was done by most of the other Buddhist sects of the time.

The East Mountain School incorporated both the Laṅkāvatāra Sūtra and the Mahaprajnaparamita Sutras.

The view of the mind in the Awakening of Faith in the Mahayana also had a significant import on the doctrinal development of the East Mountain Teaching:

Meditation
There were three main meditation techniques taught by this school. One was a meditation on śūnyatā "emptiness" in which one contemplates all dharmas of body and mind as empty. Another practice was the contemplation of some 'ultimate principle', this was associated with the 'one-practice samadhi' and in some texts such as the Lengqie shizi ji is achieved by meditating on a single Buddha. The third technique was the practice of concentrating the mind on one thing (guan yi wu) until the mind becomes fixed in samadhi. The goal of all of these practices was to not be hindered by the stream of thoughts which clouds the mind and allow the practitioner to gain insight into the pure, radiant consciousness in everyone.

Maintaining the One
According to John R. McRae the "first explicit statement of the sudden and direct approach that was to become the hallmark of Ch'an religious practice" first appears in a Chinese text named the Ju-tao an-hsin yao-fang-pien fa-men (JTFM, Instructions on essential expedients for calming the mind and accessing the path), itself a part of the Leng Ch'ieh Shih TZu Chi (Records of the Masters of the Lankavatara). The Records of the Masters of the Lankavatara is associated with the early Chan tradition known as the "East Mountain School" and has been dated to around 713. 

This method is named "Maintaining the one without wavering" (shou-i pu i, 守一不移). According to McRae:...the practical explanation of "maintaining the One without wavering" is that one is simply to contemplate every aspect of one's mental and physical existence, focusing on each individual component with unswerving attention until one realizes its essential emptiness or non-substantiality. The interesting aspect of this regimen is, paradoxically, its apparent conventionality. Although further examination will reveal significant differences between this and traditional Buddhist meditation practice, the description given so far would apply equally well to the most basic of Mahayana techniques: the insight-oriented contemplation of the non-substantiality of the body. 

Although this type of contemplation is the common property of virtually all schools of Mahayana Buddhism, its presentation here differs in at least two ways from that found in more traditional texts. First, no preparatory requirements, no moral prerequisites or preliminary exercises are given. Instead, one moves directly into the practice of contemplation. Second, the technique of "maintaining the One without wavering" is in itself completely without steps or gradations. One concentrates, understands, and is enlightened, all in one undifferentiated practice.McRae further notes thatthe JTFM makes allowance for both sudden apperception of the Buddha Nature and gradual improvement in the brightness and purity of the concentrated mind...the JTFM actually allows for a number of alternative situations: One may achieve "bright purity" of mind either with or without undertaking the extended practice of "viewing the mind." One may also achieve enlightenment either solely through one's own efforts or, conversely, with the aid of a teacher's instruction. The point of these alternatives is that a true teacher must be able to understand which students are best suited for which approach and to teach them differently on the basis of that understanding.

Fourth Patriarch Daoxin (四祖道信)
Daoxin is credited with several important innovations that led directly to the ability of Chan to become a popular religion. Among his most important contributions were:
 The Unification of Chan practice with acceptance of the Buddhist precepts,
 The unification of the teachings of the Laṅkāvatāra Sūtra with those of the Mahaprajnaparamita Sutras, which includes the well-known Heart Sutra and Diamond Sutra,
 The incorporation of chanting, including chanting the name of Buddha, into Chan practice.

Fifth Patriarch Hongren (五祖弘忍)
Hongren was a plain meditation teacher, who taught students of "various religious interests", including "practitioners of the Lotus Sutra, students of Madhyamaka philosophy, or specialists in the monastic regulations of Buddhist Vinaya".

Following Daoxin, Hongren included an emphasis on the Mahaprajnaparamita Sutras, including the Heart Sutra and the Diamond Sutra, along with the emphasis on the Laṅkāvatāra Sūtra.

Though Hongren was known for not compiling writings and for teaching Zen principles orally, the classical Chan text Discourse on the Highest Vehicle, is attributed to him. This work emphasizes the practice of "maintaining the original true mind" that "naturally cuts off the arising of delusion."

Split in Northern and Southern School
Originally Shenxiu was considered to be the "Sixth Patriarch", carrying the mantle of Bodhidharma's Zen through the East Mountain School.  After the death of Shenxiu, his student Shenhui started a campaign to establish Huineng as the Sixth Ancestor. Eventually Shenhui's position won the day, and Huineng was recognized as the Sixth Patriarch.

The successful promulgation of Shenhui's views led to Shenxiu's branch being widely referred to by others as the "Northern School."  This nomenclature has continued in western scholarship, which for the most part has largely viewed Chinese Zen through the lens of southern Chan.

Northern and Southern School (南頓北漸)
The terms Northern and Southern have little to do with geography:

The basic difference is between approaches. Shenhui characterised the Northern School as employing gradual teachings, while his Southern school employed sudden teachings:

The term "East Mountain Teaching" is seen as more culturally and historically appropriate.

But the characterization of Shenxiu's East Mountain Teaching as gradualist is argued to be unfounded in light of the documents found amongst Dunhuang manuscripts recovered from the Mogao Caves near Dunhuang.  Shenhui's Southern School incorporated Northern teachings as well, and Shenhui himself admittedly saw the need of further practice after initial awakening.

Shenxiu (神秀, 606?-706 CE)
Yuquan Shenxiu's prominent position in the history of Chán, despite the popular narrative, is recognized by modern scholarship:

Kuiken (undated: p. 17) in discussing a Dunhuang document of the Tang monk and meditator, 'Jingjue' (靜覺, 683- ca. 750) states:
Jingjue's Record introduces Hongren of Huangmei 黃梅宏忍 (d.u.) as the main teacher in the sixth generation of the 'southern' or 'East Mountain' meditation tradition. Shenxiu is mentioned as Hongren's authorized successor. In Shenxiu's shadow, Jingjue mentions 'old An' 老安 (see A) as a 'seasoned' meditation teacher and some minor 'local disciples' of Hongren.

Shenxiu wrote a treatise on meditation called the Kuan-hsin lun ("treatise on contemplating the mind"). It combines some of the meditation practices taught by Zhiyi with ideas from the Awakening of Faith in the Mahayana.

Hui-neng (六祖惠能 or 慧能大師)
The story of Huineng is famously worded in the Platform Sutra, a text which originated after Shenhui's death. Its core may have originated within the so-called Oxhead school. The text was subsequently edited and enlarged, and reflects various Chán teachings. It de-emphasizes the difference between the Northern and the Southern School.

The first chapter of the Platform Sutra relates the story of Huineng and his inheritance of the East Mountain Teachings.

Wider influence of the East Mountain Teachings
The tradition of a list of patriarchs, which granted credibility to the developing tradition, developed early in the Chán tradition:

Faru (法如, 638-689 CE)
Faru (法如, 638-689) was "the first pioneer" and "actual founder" of the Northern School. His principal teachers were Hui-ming and Daman Hongren (Hung-jen). He was sent to Hongren by Hui-ming, and attained awakening when studying with Hung-jen

Originally Faru too was credited to be the successor of Hongren. But Faru did not have a good publicist, and he was not included within the list of Chan Patriarchs.

Because of Faru, the 'Shaolin Monastery', constructed in 496CE, yet again became prominent. [Faru] had only a brief stay at Shaolin Temple, but during his stay the cloister became the epicentre of the flourishing Chan movement. An epitaph commemorating the success of Faru's pioneering endeavors is located on Mount Sung.

Baotang Wuzhu
Baotang Wuzhu (714-774), founder and abbot of Baotang Monastery in Chengdu in Southwest China was a member of the East Mountain Teachings.

Moheyan (late eighth century CE, 大乘和尚 or 摩訶衍)
Moheyan (late eighth century CE) was a proponent of the Northern School. Moheyan traveled to Dunhuang, which at the time belonged to the Ancient Tibetan Empire, in 781 or 787 CE.

Moheyan participated in a prolonged debate with Kamalashila at Samye in Tibet over sudden versus gradual teachings, which was decisive for the course the Tibetan Buddhist tradition took:

Broughton identifies the Chinese and Tibetan nomenclature of Mohoyen's teachings and identifies them principally with the East Mountain Teachings:

The teachings of Moheyan and other Chan masters were unified with the Kham Dzogchen lineages {this may or may not be congruent with the Kahma (Tibetan: bka' ma) lineages} through the Kunkhyen (Tibetan for "omniscient"), Rongzom Chokyi Zangpo.

The Dzogchen ("Great Perfection") School of the Nyingmapa was often identified with the 'sudden enlightenment' (Tibetan: cig car gyi ‘jug pa) of Moheyan and was called to defend itself against this charge by avowed members of the Sarma lineages that held to the staunch view of 'gradual enlightenmnent' (Tibetan: rim gyis ‘jug pa).

See also
Rongzom Chokyi Zangpo
Yuquan Shenxiu
Mount Wutai

References

Sources

Further reading

Print
Matsumoto, Shiro (松本史郞) (undated). Critical Considerations on Zen Thought. Komazawa University. Source:  (accessed: January 25, 2008)
Poceski, Mario (undated). Attitudes Towards Canonicity and Religious Authority in Tang Chan. University of Florida. Source:  (accessed: January 25, 2008)
Dumoulin, Heinrich (author); Heisig, James W. (trans.) & Knitter, Paul (trans.)(1988). Zen Buddhism: A History. Volume 1 India and China. New York, N.Y.: Macmillan Publishing Company.  (2 vol. set; paper)
McRae, John R.(1983). The Northern School of Chinese Chan Buddhism. Ph.D. dissertation, Yale University.
Faure, Bernard (1997). The Will to Orthodoxy: A Critical Genealogy of Northern Chan Buddhism. Translated by Phyllis Brooks, Stanford, Stanford University Press.
Adamek, Wendi L. (2007). The Mystique of Transmission: On an Early Chan History and its Contents. New York, Columbia University Press. 
Cole, Alan,(2009). Fathering Your Father: The Zen of Fabrication in Tang Buddhism. Berkeley, University of California Press.

Electronic
Zeuschner, Robert B.(1978). "The understanding of mind in the Northern line of Ch'an (Zen)" in Philosophy East and West, Vol.28, No.1. Hawaii, USA: University of Hawaii Press. Source:  (accessed: August 6, 2008)
Poceski, Mario (2007). Patterns of Engagement with Chan Teachings Among the Mid-Tang Literati. Association of Asian Studies Annual Meeting, Boston 2007. “Intersections of Buddhist Practice, Art, and Culture in Tang China” Panel. University of Florida. Source:  (accessed: January 25, 2008)
Kuiken, Kees (undated). The Other Neng 2: Part Two Sources and Resources. Source:  (accessed: August 6, 2008)
Dumoulin, Heinrich (1993). "Early Chinese Zen Reexamined ~ A Supplement to 'Zen Buddhism: A History'" in Japanese Journal of Religious Studies 1993 20/1. Source:  (accessed: August 6, 2008)
Schlütter, Morten (2007). 'Transmission and Enlightenment in Chan Buddhism Seen Through the Platform Sūtra (Liuzu tanjing 六祖壇經).' Chung-Hwa Buddhist Journal, no. 20, pp. 379–410 (2007). Taipei: Chung-Hwa Institute of Buddhist Studies. Source:  (accessed: Saturday April 11, 2009)

Chan Buddhism

pl:Północna szkoła chan